Crookhorn College is a coeducational foundation secondary school, located in Waterlooville in the English county of Hampshire.

It is administered by Hampshire County Council, which coordinates the schools admissions. Previously known as Crookhorn Community School, it gained specialist Technology College status and was renamed Crookhorn College of Technology. It is now named Crookhorn College.

Crookhorn College offers GCSEs as programmes of study for pupils, as well as some vocational courses in conjunction with South Downs College.

References

External links
Crookhorn College official website

Secondary schools in Hampshire
Foundation schools in Hampshire